Bryan Silva Garcia (born 28 March 1992), sometimes known as just Bryan, is a Brazilian footballer who plays as a left back.

Club career
Born in Belo Horizonte, Minas Gerais, Bryan Garcia finished his formation with América Mineiro. On 29 January 2012 he made his professional debut, starting in a 3–1 away victory over Democrata GV. Bryan Garcia scored his first career goal on 1 March, the first of a 2–1 home win over Villa Nova.

On 31 January 2013, Bryan Garcia was loaned to S.L. Benfica until June with a buyout clause, being assigned to the B-team in Segunda Liga. He made his debut for Benfica B on 10 February 2013, in a 0–1 away loss against C.D. Tondela. He finished the season with six appearances (five as a starter), but returned to América Mineiro after the Encarnados deciding to not buy him outright.

On 16 September, Bryan Garcia was loaned to Portuguesa, until May 2014. He made his Série A debut three days later, starting and providing an assist in a 3–0 home win over Náutico.

On 30 April 2014, Bryan Garcia joined Ponte Preta on loan until the end of the year.

On 28 February 2020, FC Alashkert announced the signing of Bryan Garcia.

On 14 January 2022, Astana announced the signing of Bryan Garcia on a contract until the end of 2022. On 11 December 2022, Astana announced the departure of Bryan Garcia.

References

External links

1992 births
Living people
Footballers from Belo Horizonte
Brazilian footballers
Association football defenders
Campeonato Brasileiro Série A players
Campeonato Brasileiro Série B players
Liga Portugal 2 players
Armenian Premier League players
Kazakhstan Premier League players
América Futebol Clube (MG) players
Associação Portuguesa de Desportos players
Associação Atlética Ponte Preta players
Cruzeiro Esporte Clube players
Esporte Clube Vitória players
Clube de Regatas Brasil players
S.L. Benfica B players
FC Alashkert players
FC Atyrau players
Brazilian expatriate footballers
Brazilian expatriate sportspeople in Portugal
Brazilian expatriate sportspeople in Armenia
Brazilian expatriate sportspeople in Kazakhstan
Expatriate footballers in Portugal
Expatriate footballers in Armenia
Expatriate footballers in Kazakhstan